Panorama Studios is an Indian film production and distribution company established by Ajay Devgn 's exclusive manager Kumar Mangat Pathak. Along with its subsidiaries and associates, is a diversified film studio with various business segments such as production and distribution.

Films produced
 Dil Toh Baccha Hai Ji (2011)
 Akaash Vani (2013)
 Aatma - Feel It Around You (2013)
 Alone (2015)
 Pyaar Ka Punchnama 2 (2015)
 Drishyam (2015)
 Guest iin London (2017)
 Raid (2018)
 Ujda Chaman (2019)
 Pagalpanti (2019)
 Section 375 (2019)
 Khuda Haafiz (2020)
 Dybbuk (2020)
 Dehati Disco (2022)
 Khuda Haafiz: Chapter II – Agni Pariksha (2022)
 Siya (2022)
 Drishyam 2 (2022)

Films distributed
 Gabbar Is Back (2015)
 Mastizaade (2016)
 Azhar (2016)
 Rustom (2016)
 Veerey Ki Wedding (2018)
 Satyameva Jayate (2018)
 Batti Gul Meter Chalu (2018)
 Baazaar (2018)
 PM Narendra Modi (2019)
 Batla House (2019)
 Chicken Curry Law (2019)
 Sab Kushal Mangal (2020)
 Fauji Calling (2021)Vakeel Saab (2021) 
 Runway 34 (2022) DAMaN (2023) Hindi Version
 Kisi Ka Bhai Kisi Ki Jaan (2023)
 Bawaal (2023)
 Jawan (2023)
 Satyaprem Ki Katha (2023)
 Tariq'' (2023)

References

Film distributors of India
Film production companies based in Mumbai
Indian companies established in 2012
2012 establishments in Maharashtra
Mass media companies established in 2012